Maxwell Johannes Domi (born March 2, 1995) is a Canadian professional ice hockey player for the Dallas Stars of the National Hockey League (NHL). He was selected by the Phoenix Coyotes in the first round, 12th overall, of the 2013 NHL Entry Draft.

Playing career

Amateur
He was selected by the Kingston Frontenacs with the eighth pick of the 2011 Ontario Hockey League (OHL) draft, but was subsequently traded for three second-round draft picks to the London Knights. In his OHL debut against the Saginaw Spirit, on September 23, 2011, Domi scored a hat trick and recorded an assist to lead the Knights in an 8–0 victory. During the 2011–12 season, he won a bronze medal with Team Ontario at the 2012 World U-17 Hockey Challenge, and helped the Knights capture the 2012 OHL Championship. Domi was rated as a top prospect who fulfilled the expectation to be a first round selection at the 2013 NHL Entry Draft.

During the 2012–13 season, Domi played with Team Canada to win a gold medal at the 2012 Ivan Hlinka Memorial Tournament, was an invited participant at the 2013 CHL Top Prospects Game and led his London Knights team to capture their second consecutive OHL Championship. He was also a part of the Canadian team that won gold at the 2015 World Junior Ice Hockey Championship, being named the tournament's Best Forward, and was selected for the tournament's All-Star Team.

Professional

Arizona Coyotes
At the 2013 NHL Entry Draft, Domi was selected 12th overall by the Phoenix Coyotes. His father, Tie, had previously played for the franchise when it was known as the Winnipeg Jets (the team would move to Phoenix in 1996). On July 14, 2013, Domi signed a three-year, entry-level contract with Phoenix.

Coyotes' general manager Don Maloney confirmed fan speculation by saying he acquired prospect Anthony Duclair from the New York Rangers in the hopes he would develop line chemistry with Domi. This was due to the fact that during the 2015 World Junior Ice Hockey Championship both Duclair and Domi showed visible chemistry and were key components in leading team Canada to gold.

In his first NHL season, Domi developed instant line chemistry with Duclair, earning the duo the nickname "The Killer D's". Domi scored his first career assist and goal in his NHL debut against the Los Angeles Kings on October 9, 2015, against Jonathan Quick. On January 12, 2016, Domi recorded his first career NHL hat trick against the Edmonton Oilers. Two of his goals came on the power play, and defenceman Oliver Ekman-Larsson assisted on all three goals.

Montreal Canadiens
On June 15, 2018, Domi was traded to the Montreal Canadiens in exchange for Alex Galchenyuk. The following day, Domi signed a two-year, $6.3 million contract extension with Montreal. In a preseason game against the Florida Panthers on September 19, Domi sucker punched Panthers defenceman Aaron Ekblad, resulting in Domi's suspension for the remainder of the preseason.

On October 3, 2018, Domi recorded two assists in the season opener as the Canadiens lost 3–2 in overtime to the Toronto Maple Leafs. On October 17, Domi scored his first goal for Montreal in a 3–2 victory over the St. Louis Blues.  He ended the 2018–19 season with 72 points, making him the first player since Tomáš Plekanec in 2009–10 to score 70 points or more in a single season for the Canadiens.

Columbus Blue Jackets

On October 6, 2020, Domi and a third-round pick in the 2020 NHL Entry Draft were traded to the Columbus Blue Jackets in exchange for forward Josh Anderson. On October 7, Domi signed a two-year, $10.6 million contract extension with the Blue Jackets.

Carolina Hurricanes
While in his final season under contract with the Blue Jackets, Domi was dealt by the Blue Jackets at the NHL trade deadline to the Carolina Hurricanes via the Florida Panthers in a three team trade on March 21, 2022. After posting two goals and five assists in nineteen regular season games with the Hurricanes, the team advanced into the 2022 Stanley Cup playoffs for a first round matchup with the Boston Bruins. Domi distinguished himself in Game 7, scoring two goals and recording a primary assist on a third in the team's 3–2 series-clinching victory over the Bruins. Many commentators called it the finest game of Domi's career to that point.

Chicago Blackhawks
On July 13, 2022, Domi was signed to a one-year, $3 million contract with the Chicago Blackhawks.

Dallas Stars
On March 2, 2023, Domi’s 28th birthday, the Blackhawks traded the forward along with Dylan Wells to the Dallas Stars in exchange for Anton Khudobin and a second-round pick in the 2025 NHL Entry Draft.

Personal life
Domi was born in Winnipeg, Manitoba, but grew up in Toronto, Ontario, when his father Tie Domi was a member of the original Winnipeg Jets franchise. Growing up, Domi's favourite team was the Toronto Maple Leafs, partially due to his father's many seasons with the club. Domi is of Albanian descent—his paternal grandparents immigrated to Canada during wars and tumult in Albania.

Domi has Type 1 Diabetes which was diagnosed at age 12 following a hockey tournament in Detroit. He regulates his blood sugar levels using an insulin pump attached to his hip. During games, he excuses himself every 15 minutes to test his blood glucose level. Domi wore the number 16 during his time in Arizona in homage to Bobby Clarke, a famed hockey player who also suffered with the condition. He switched to number 13 after a trade to Montreal due to 16 being retired, as well as to pay tribute to his godfather, Mats Sundin.

In 2019, Domi and author Jim Lang published a book, No Days Off: My Life with Type 1 Diabetes and Journey to the NHL.

International play

Domi represented Team Canada at the 2015 World Junior Ice Hockey Championships, winning gold. Domi later made his senior national debut with Canada at the 2016 World Championship, winning gold.

Career statistics

Regular season and playoffs

International

Awards and honours

References

External links
 
 

1995 births
Living people
Arizona Coyotes draft picks
Arizona Coyotes players
Canadian expatriate ice hockey players in the United States
Canadian ice hockey left wingers
Canadian people of Albanian descent
Carolina Hurricanes players
Chicago Blackhawks players
Columbus Blue Jackets players
Dallas Stars players
Ice hockey people from Toronto
Ice hockey people from Winnipeg
London Knights players
Montreal Canadiens players
National Hockey League first-round draft picks
People with type 1 diabetes